Brachymonas denitrificans is a  nonmotile, Gram-negative, aerobic, chemo-organotrophic bacterium from the genus Brachymonas and family Comamonadaceae. B. denitrificans has no flagella and its colonies are cream to pale yellow.

References

External links
Type strain of Brachymonas denitrificans at BacDive -  the Bacterial Diversity Metadatabase

Comamonadaceae
Bacteria described in 1995